Pilar Corrias is a British contemporary art gallery founded by Pilar Corrias. Its first gallery space in Eastcastle Street, London, designed by Rem Koolhaas, opened in 2008. At the time, Corrias was the first woman to open a new art gallery in the West End of London for a decade. In July 2021, the gallery opened a second space in Savile Row, London, designed by Oslo architects Hesselbrand, with Chalk Mark, an exhibition by Iranian-American artist Tala Madani.

History 
Founded by Pilar Corrias, a former director of Lisson Gallery and Haunch of Venison, the gallery opened on 16 October 2008 with the exhibition October by Philippe Parreno. The show featured a cast aluminium Christmas tree titled Fraught Times: For Eleven Months of the Year It's an Artwork and in December It’s Christmas (October), which is now held in the collection of the Pompidou Centre. American visual artist Rachel Rose first exhibited her work Lake Valley at Pilar Corrias in 2016, which was later presented at the 2017 Venice Biennale and the Carnegie International, 57th Edition, 2018.A number of the artists discovered by Corrias had their first UK solo show at the gallery, including Ian Cheng, Helen Johnson, Tala Madani, Christina Quarles, Mary Reid Kelley, Tschabalala Self and Gisela McDaniel.

Artists 
The gallery represents thirty-two emerging and established, international artists, and is noted for its strong female presence, being one of only a handful of contemporary art galleries worldwide that represents more female artists than male artists. According to Corrias, many of the gallery's artists share an interest in revising narratives of art history from a female perspective.

Represented artists include: Christina Quarles, Cui Jie, Elizabeth Neel, Hayv Kahraman, Lina Iris Viktor, Helen Johnson, Ian Cheng, Julião Sarmento, Keren Cytter, Koo Jeong A, Mary Ramsden, Mary Reid Kelley, Philippe Parreno, Rachel Rose, Rirkrit Tiravanija, Robert Reed, Sabine Moritz, Shahzia Sikander, Shara Hughes, Sophie von Hellermann, Tala Madani, Tschabalala Self and Ulla von Brandenburg.

References

External links 

 

Art galleries in London
Contemporary art galleries in London
Art galleries established in 2008
2008 establishments in England